Joanna Jordan may refer to:
Joanna Jordan (talent booker) (born 1966/7)
Joanna Jordan (Irish campaigner), launched legal challenges against Irish referendum results in 2012 and 2018
Joanna Jordan (Shortland Street), a character in Shortland Street

See also
Joanne Jordan (1920–2009), American actress and television spokesmodel